Bacaad, Bender Ba'ad, Bender Bacaad is a coastal town in the northeastern Bari region of Somalia.
Both Bacaad and Bur Gaban are inhabited by Dishiishe clan

Reference

 Populated places in Bari, Somalia